Denis Sergeyevich Matsukevich (born 28 March 1986) is a professional tennis player from Russia.

He swept five singles Futures titles in his career. His coach is Valeriy Skhliar.

Career titles

External links
 
 

Living people
1986 births
Russian male tennis players